

Results

Men's individual

Women's individual

Men's team 

 Athletes in  italics  did not score for their team but received medals

Women's team 

 Athletes in  italics  did not score for their team but received medals

References

Results
Results. Association of Road Racing Statisticians. Retrieved 2020-05-24.
Copa De Europa 10.000 metros. Royal Spanish Athletics Federation. Retrieved 2020-05-24.

External links
 European Athletics website

European 10,000m Cup
European Cup 10,000m
Sport in Maribor
International athletics competitions hosted by Slovenia
10,000m Cup
10,000m Cup
April 2004 sports events in Europe